Hin Hua High School is a Chinese Independent High School in Malaysia. One of the four Chinese Independent Schools in Selangor (and more specifically Klang), it is arguably one of the best-known Chinese independent schools in Selangor. Founded in 1947 by the joint efforts of parents, teachers and fellow students, the institution has undergone multiple restructuring and reformation activities since 1969, especially flourishing under the leadership of the late Madam Chang Sa Yeok, who served as principal from 1969-1992.

Today, Hin Hua High School is a prominent Chinese Independent institution equipped with one of the most modern facilities in the area. It also holds the prestige of having one of the highest student counts in Klang. As of May 2019, Hin Hua High School has 3369 students and 420 teaching staff including the janitorial staffs.

History

Early stages (1947-1979) 
The school was founded on 15 June 1947 by a group of Klang Chinese parents, teachers and students. Renamed to Hin Hua High School and established together with Hin Hua Primary School, it was first run by Mr. Loo Keat Poh as chairman and Zhang Lian Zong as principal, with rudimentary Atap-roofed buildings to support an initial 209 students and a nominal teaching staff.

In 1949, Zeng Bing Mei, led by the school's Development Committee raised funds to purchase 4 acres of land. This was followed by the construction of a more modern school compound, laying the foundation for the development of our school. A "Group Education Society" was also established, performing a similar function as a student council. A society was also created for the school to publish its only literature.

In 1960, the school faced a crisis. The government's new education act (see Razak Report, 1956) called for a national school system consisting of Malay-, English-, Chinese- and Tamil-medium schools at the primary level, and Malay- and English-medium schools at the secondary schools, with a uniform national curriculum regardless of the medium of instruction. This went against the school's Chinese and English-only education philosophy. After intense counsel, the school decided to persevere with its current course and refuse to adhere to the Razak Report.

However, under the influence of the new Education Act, the number of students decreased year by year. At first student numbers stayed high, with 451 students at 1960, but by the end of 1968 only 30 students attended the school. Faced with a hopeless situation, Principal Zhang Lian Zong retired that year.

In 1969, the board of directors was reorganized. Six remaining teachers decided to rejuvenate the rundown institute and ran three classes themselves, teaching 64 students. To raise awareness for parents concerned about Chinese education, the teachers began a campaign to invite newly-graduated primary school students for enrollment. These activities became a "tradition" of the school and is still organized yearly to this day.. By 1970, student numbers managed to increase to more than 200.

In 1972, under the leadership of Zhang Han Wen, the school received its first library, as well as upgraded scientific facilities. He also organized the first ever Lim Lian Yu Marathon. In 1974, Ms. Cheng Rui Yu, assisted by the School Administrative Committee, managed to raise funds and buy large amounts of literature to enrich the school's library. She was also pivotal in the establishment of Chinese traditional activities as well as Mathematics and Art societies to encourage students to engage in the arts.

1976 was the year Hin Hua held a large-scale charity entertainment city, raising USD120,000 and shattering numerous fund-raising records. With the funds, two additional classroom and two double student dormitories were subsequently built, opening the school to accommodate a larger number of students. The remaining money was used to host a scholarship system for incoming pupils.

A second reformation was held in 1977, expanding the school facility extensively and reorganizing the school's systems. In 1979, the number of students reached 854, and a second donation movement to raise funds managed to raise RM1.5 million (about USD700,000, 1980 conversion rate), paving the way for more expansion.

Modernization (1980–present) 
A new project was held to reconstruct the school, marking a massive expansion. The first phase was completed at 1982, its second phase was completed in 1983, and finally,

1983 also marked the implementation of a new salary system, and the installation of a new board of directors to better serve the school. This board of directors proved to have a profound effect in making the school flourish in the following years. A computer lab was installed for high school students as well.

Apart from the above changes, more co-curricular activities were organized, including sports, music and mass media societies.

Annual funding was increased in 1985, in part supplemented by multiple funding activities. That year, to promote traditional Chinese activity participation, the Lion Dance group was also created, boasting 30 teams by 1988. The Lion Dance Group is having the most golden lions in Malaysia record. 

From then on, funding was steady, with the flow of cash from the vibrant Chinese community supporting these schools with ever-increasing passion. The school has undergone multiple renovations, most notably building the Science and Technology Tower in 2013, providing the school with scientific facilities that rival those of some local universities. To this day, Hin Hua High School remains one of the best Chinese Independent schools in Malaysia, consistently holding one of the best records in the UEC examination.

See also 
 List of schools in Selangor

External links
 Hin Hua High School
 Hin Hua High School 

Educational institutions established in 1947
1947 establishments in Malaya
Chinese-language schools in Malaysia
Schools in Selangor